Tetrasomy 18p is a genetic condition that is caused by the presence of an isochromosome composed of two copies of the short arm of chromosome 18 in addition to the two normal copies of the chromosome. It is characterized by multiple medical and developmental concerns.

Signs and symptoms 

Tetrasomy 18p causes a wide range of medical and developmental problems.

Congenital anomalies

Cardiac anomalies are the most common congenital malformation in individuals with tetrasomy 18p.  However, there is no pathognomatic heart defect associated with the condition.  Patent ductus arteriosus is the most common defect.  Septal defects (ventricular septal defects and atrial septal defects) are also common, as are patent foramina ovalia.  Other cardiac anomalies include mitral valve regurgitation,  mitral valve prolapse, bicuspid pulmonary valve, hypoplastic transverse aortic arch, tricuspid valve regurgitation, right ventricular hypertrophy, and pulmonic stenosis.

In males, cryptorchidism is common.  Abnormal genitalia in females is not a common feature.  Renal abnormalities have been reported in a minority of patients.  Horseshoe kidney and bladder diverticuli have been reported.  Other abdominal malformations, including pyloric stenosis and hernias, have also been reported, though they are present in only a minority of patients.Orthopedic anomalies also occur relatively frequently, with hip dysplasia being the most common orthopedic issue.  Clubfoot and rocker bottom feet have also been reported.Myelomeningocele is another known feature associated with tetrasomy 18p.

Neonatal complications 

Neonatal complications (apart from congenital anomalies) are common.  In a paper published in 2010, 41 of 42 individuals had some type medical problem in the first days of life, the most common being feeding difficulties.  Respiratory difficulty and jaundice are also relatively frequent.

ENT 

Recurrent otitis media is common, and many patients required the placement of PE tubes.  Small ear canals are also fairly common, but not as much as in 18q-.

Gastrointestinal

The most common gastrointestinal abnormality is chronic constipation, though gastrointestinal reflux was also common.

Endocrine

Growth hormone deficiency is present in about 20% of people with tetrasomy 18p.

Neurologic

Hypotonia and/or hypertonia are present in nearly all individuals with tetrasomy 18p.  Approximately 25% have a seizure disorder.

Growth 

Short stature is common, with ~50% being at or below the 25th centile and 20% being at or below the 3rd centile.  Microcephaly is present in about 40% of patients.

Development 

All reported cases of tetrasomy 18p have some degree of intellectual disability.  Most individuals score in the moderate range of intellectual disability based on standardized testing.

Genetics 

Tetrasomy 18p is caused by the presence of an additional isochromosome composed of two copies of the p arm of chromosome 18. This extra chromosome is classified as a small supernumerary marker chromosome that forms de novo in a parent's egg or sperm or, in rare cases, is directly inherited from a parent carrier of the intact small supernumerary marker chromosome. It has been reported in both the non-mosaic as well as the mosaic state.  (The phrase "mosaicism" in this context means that some cells carry the genetic change while others do not.)  In the grand majority of cases, the isochromosome is de novo.  Although there has been some speculation that tetrasomy 18p may occur with a higher frequency in children of older mothers, there is not enough evidence to say that this is definitively the case.

Diagnosis 

Suspicion of a chromosome abnormality is typically raised due to the presence of developmental delays or congenital malformations.  Diagnosis of tetrasomy 18p is typically made via a routine chromosome analysis from a blood sample. The diagnosis can also be made prenatally by chorionic villus sampling or amniocentesis.

Severity of tetrasomy 18p is variable. Individuals with mosaicism are typically less severely affected than non-mosaic individuals.

Management

At present, treatment for tetrasomy 18p is symptomatic, meaning that the focus is on treating the signs and symptoms of the conditions as they arise. The Chromosome 18 Clinical Research Center has published a list of recommended screening and evaluations:

Research 

Current research is focusing on clearly defining the phenotype associated with tetrasomy 18p and identifying which genes cause medical and developmental problems when present in four copies.

References

External links

Genetic disorders with no OMIM